The Combined Reserve Football League was formed in 1958 as a reserve football league for the Scottish Football League Second Division sides that were excluded from the Scottish Reserve Football League. The original five clubs were Albion Rovers 'A', Dumbarton 'A', Morton 'A', Queen's Park Strollers plus Celtic's third eleven. Because of the small number of clubs involved, the league was normally played over an autumn and spring series. Another aspect of the league's membership was the frequent inclusion of non-league clubs.

Although the league disbanded in 1972, its name was resurrected by the Scottish League for its minor reserve sides.

Champions
1958–1959 (Autumn) Dumbarton 'A' (Spring)
1959–1960 (Autumn) Queen of the South 'A' (Spring) East Dundee United  'A' West Queen of the South 'A'
1960–1961 Celtic 'B'
1961–1962 (Autumn) Clyde 'A' (Spring) Celtic 'B'
1962–1963 (Autumn) Celtic 'B' (Spring) Celtic 'B'
1963–1964 (Autumn) Celtic 'B' (Spring) Celtic 'B'
1964–1965 (Autumn) Arbroath 'A' (Spring) Raith Rovers 'A'
1965–1966 (Autumn) East Fife 'A' (Spring)  Celtic 'B'
1966–1967 (Autumn) Celtic 'B' (Spring) Queen's Park Strollers
1967–1968 (Autumn) Heart of Midlothian 'B' (Spring)  unfinished
1968–1969 Motherwell 'A'
1969–1970 (Autumn) Rangers 'B' (Spring)  unfinished
1970–1971 (Autumn) Partick Thistle 'A' (Spring) Partick Thistle 'A'
1971–1972 unfinished
1973–1974 unfinished
1975–1976 Partick Thistle 'A'

Member Clubs
Although the league's membership was predominantly reserve sides, a number of non-league clubs were involved at various stages. Clydebank were involved in their first season and gained election to the Scottish Football League in 1966.

Clydebank 1965–1966
Drumchapel Amateurs 1971–1972
Glasgow Corporation Transport 1967–1971
Glasgow University 1966–1972
Jordanhill Technical College 1964–1972
Stirling University 1971–1972

See also
 Scottish Football (Defunct Leagues)

Defunct football leagues in Scotland
Scottish Football League
Scot